Wangcang County is a county in the northeast of Sichuan Province, China, bordering Shaanxi province to the north. It is under the administration of Guangyuan city.

Climate

References

County-level divisions of Sichuan